Foothills School Division No. 38 or Foothills School Division is a public school authority within the Canadian province of Alberta operated out of High River.

See also 
List of school authorities in Alberta

References

External links 

High River
School districts in Alberta